Barfussia laxissima is a species in the genus Barfussia. This species is endemic to Bolivia.

References

BSI Cultivar Registry Retrieved 11 October 2009

Tillandsioideae
Flora of Bolivia